Onnyos (Önñüös) is a rural locality (a selo) and the administrative center of Amgino-Nakharinsky Rural Okrug of Amginsky District in the Sakha Republic, Russia, located  from Amga, the administrative center of the district. Its population as of the 2010 Census was 586; down from 614 recorded in the 2002 Census.

References

Notes

Sources
Official website of the Sakha Republic. Registry of the Administrative-Territorial Divisions of the Sakha Republic. Amginsky District. 

Rural localities in Amginsky District